ZTF J1813+4251 is a binary star system including a star and white dwarf, co-orbiting every 51 minutes, about 3,000 light years away in the constellation of Hercules. It is considered a cataclysmic variable with the white dwarf pulling outer layers of hydrogen from the star onto itself. It has the shortest orbital period of all hydrogen-rich cataclysmic variable stars known. It is predicted that the orbital period will reach a minimum of 18 minutes within 75 million years as the system evolves.

It was identified in 2022 by Kevin Burdge of MIT using a computer algorithm that searched over 1,000 images from the Zwicky Transient Facility, identifying stars that had brightness variability periods around one hour.

References

External links
 Astronomers find a “cataclysmic” pair of stars with the shortest orbit yet
 Scientists spot ‘cataclysmic star pair’ whirring around each other in spectacular dance
 "Cataclysmic" Pair Of Stars With Shortest Known Orbit Discovered
 Two Stars Orbiting Each Other Every 51 Minutes. This Can’t End Well

Cataclysmic variable stars
Hercules (constellation)
Astronomical objects discovered in 2022